Le acrobate is a 1997 Italian drama film directed by Silvio Soldini and starring Licia Maglietta and Valeria Golino. It was shown at the Cannes Film Festival in May 1997 in the Directors' Fortnight section.

Cast 
 Licia Maglietta: Elena
 Valeria Golino: Maria 
 Angela Marraffa: Teresa
 Mira Sardoc: Anita
 : Mirko
 Teresa Saponangelo: Giusi
 Roberto Citran: Elena's Ex Husband
 Fabrizio Bentivoglio: Stefano
 Giuseppe Battiston: Mondini

References

External links 
 

1997 films
Italian drama films
1990s Italian-language films
Films directed by Silvio Soldini
1997 drama films
1990s Italian films